Youri Raffi Djorkaeff (born 9 March 1968) is a French former professional footballer who played as an attacking midfielder or forward. Throughout his club career, he played for teams in France, Italy, Germany, England, and the United States.

At international level, Djorkaeff scored 28 goals in 82 appearances with the France national team between 1993 and 2002. He won the 1998 FIFA World Cup, Euro 2000, and the 2001 FIFA Confederations Cup, also taking part at Euro 1996 and the 2002 FIFA World Cup. He is the son of former player Jean Djorkaeff. On hanging up his boots in 2006 and after having played in France, Italy, Germany, United Kingdom and the US, Youri devoted himself to social projects, which eventually led him to establish the Youri Djorkaeff Foundation in 2014. He currently holds the position of CEO of the FIFA Foundation, following his appointment in September 2019.

Early life
Djorkaeff was born in Lyon, to a French father of Polish and Kalmyk origin, Jean Djorkaeff, and an Armenian mother, Mary Ohanian, in Lyon.

Club career
Djorkaeff started his career in 1984 with French club Grenoble, before moving to RC Strasbourg in 1989, AS Monaco in 1990, and then Paris Saint-Germain in 1995. In 1994, Djorkaeff led Division 1 in goals with 20. He won the UEFA Cup Winners' Cup with PSG in 1996.

In 1996, he signed with Italian club Inter Milan. In his first season, he scored 17 goals in 49 appearances across all competitions, scoring 14 goals in 33 Serie A appearances; with his excellent performances, he helped the club to a third–place finish in Serie A, and also reached the UEFA Cup Final, in which Inter were defeated by Schalke on penalties following a 1–1 draw on aggregate, although Djorkaeff was able to net his spot kick. During the course of the season, he also scored a memorable goal from a bicycle kick in a 3–1 home win against Roma in the league, on 5 January 1997, which is considered to be one of the greatest goals scored in the club's history. His following season was less successful individually, as he struggled to play well alongside the club's new signing Ronaldo, although collectively Inter finished the season in second place in Serie A and won the UEFA Cup, defeating Lazio 3–0 in the final at the Parc des Princes. In his third and final season with the team, following the signing of Roberto Baggio, he also struggled to find space in the team, and suffered a further loss of form; moreover, the club eventually finished the season in eighth place, outside of all possible European qualifying spots.

In 1999, he transferred to Germany and Kaiserslautern, helping them to the semi-finals of the UEFA Cup in 2001.

Djorkaeff turned many heads when signing with English club Bolton Wanderers in 2002, but added a lot of class to the team during his three seasons there, resulting in the creation of an international "dream-team" alongside the tricky Nigerian Jay-Jay Okocha, and former Real Madrid midfielder Iván Campo. He was a member of the squad that reached the final of the 2003–04 League Cup. He then transferred to Blackburn Rovers but left the club after playing in only three games.

Djorkaeff then signed with the MetroStars of Major League Soccer in February 2005, turning down higher paid offers from other countries. He became the first French player to play in MLS and ended the season as the team's MVP with ten goals and seven assists in league play.

Djorkaeff announced from the beginning that he would hang-up his boots at the end of 2006 season, and played for the re-branded New York Red Bulls. On 1 July 2006, he was spotted in the crowd with French fans at the FIFA World Cup quarter-final match between France and Brazil after telling Red Bulls officials he left the club to attend to "an unexpected, serious family matter in France." Upon his return, he revealed that the purpose of his departure was to be with his sick mother and downplayed watching the World Cup match.

He retired from professional football on 29 October 2006.

International career
Djorkaeff accumulated 82 caps and scored 28 goals for France at senior level between 1993 and 2002. Other than the two major tournaments he won with the national side – the 1998 FIFA World Cup and UEFA Euro 2000 – Djorkaeff also played for his country in UEFA Euro 1996 and the 2002 FIFA World Cup. In the 1998 FIFA World Cup Final in Paris, he set-up Zinedine Zidane's second goal from a corner in an eventual 3–0 victory over defending champions Brazil.

Style of play
Nicknamed The Snake, due to his ability to get past defenders and bend the ball, Djorkaeff was a talented playmaker, who usually played as an attacking midfielder, although he was also capable of playing in deeper positions in midfield on occasion – namely as a central midfielder –, or in more attacking roles, as a creative second striker, or even as an outright striker, while he often featured in a wide role on the left flank at international level. An elegant and technically gifted player, he was mainly known for his flair, dribbling skills, and excellent touch on the ball; he was also known for his vision, passing, composure, and class, and possessed a good shot, which enabled him both to score and create goals. He was known for his positional sense and intelligent movement off the ball, as well as his ability to lose his markers with his attacking runs and create space for himself, or provide depth to the team; he was also highly regarded for his accuracy from free kicks and penalties with his right foot. A hard-working player, who was known for his defensive contribution off the ball, he had the ability to link the defence with the attack or drift out wide in a free role in midfield; as such, his playing style and role has been described as that of a "nine and a half," half-way between that of a midfielder and that of a forward, which from a tactical standpoint, however, occasionally made it difficult for managers to find the right position for him on the pitch that best suited his capabilities. Moreover, despite his talent and success, he was also accused of being inconsistent at times in the media.

Personal life
Djorkaeff has a wife, Sophie, and three children: Sacha, Oan and Angelica. Djorkaeff released a singing single called "Vivre dans Ta Lumière", translated to "Living in Your Light" from French. His father, Jean, and younger brother, Micha Djorkaeff, were also professional football players.

On 15 November 2012 Djorkaeff hosted Phone-a-thon for Armenian charity held in Europe. The Phoneathon benefits the construction of community centres in villages throughout Nagorno Karabakh and comprehensive agricultural development in Armenia's Tavush Region. In addition, a part of the proceeds will be dedicated to providing urgent aid to the Syrian-Armenian community.

During his time in England, Djorkaeff opened a football school in Armenia. After retiring, he became the president of his childhood club in Lyon, Union Generale Armenienne de Decines, in April 2007. Djorkaeff currently also runs the Youri Djorkaeff Foundation, a non-profit organisation dedicated to providing football programs in New York City.

Ecuador forward Djorkaeff Reasco was named after Djorkaeff.

Career statistics

Club

International

Scores and results list France's goal tally first, score column indicates score after each Djorkaeff goal.

Honours
Monaco
Coupe de France: 1990–91

Paris Saint-Germain
Trophée des Champions: 1995
UEFA Cup Winners' Cup: 1995–96

Inter Milan
UEFA Cup: 1997–98

Bolton Wanderers
Football League Cup runner-up: 2003–04

France
FIFA World Cup: 1998
UEFA European Championship: 2000
FIFA Confederations Cup: 2001

Individual
Division 1 top scorer: 1993–94
UEFA European Championship Team of the Tournament: 1996
Pirata d'Oro (Inter Milan Player of the Year): 1997
FIFA XI: 1997

Orders
Knight of the Legion of Honour: 1998

See also 
 List of leading goalscorers for the France national football team

References

Bibliography
Youri Djorkaeff, Snake, Paris, Grasset and Fasquelle, 2006, .

External links

1968 births
Living people
Footballers from Lyon
French people of Kalmyk descent
French people of Armenian descent
French people of Polish descent
French footballers
France international footballers
French expatriate footballers
Grenoble Foot 38 players
RC Strasbourg Alsace players
AS Monaco FC players
Paris Saint-Germain F.C. players
Inter Milan players
Serie A players
Expatriate footballers in Italy
1. FC Kaiserslautern players
Bundesliga players
Expatriate footballers in Germany
Bolton Wanderers F.C. players
Blackburn Rovers F.C. players
New York Red Bulls players
Expatriate soccer players in the United States
Association football forwards
Premier League players
Major League Soccer players
Expatriate footballers in England
FIFA World Cup-winning players
FIFA Confederations Cup-winning players
1998 FIFA World Cup players
2001 FIFA Confederations Cup players
2002 FIFA World Cup players
UEFA Euro 1996 players
UEFA Euro 2000 players
UEFA European Championship-winning players
Chevaliers of the Légion d'honneur
Ligue 1 players
Ligue 2 players
French expatriate sportspeople in Germany
French expatriate sportspeople in Italy
French expatriate sportspeople in England
French expatriate sportspeople in the United States
Ethnic Armenian sportspeople
UEFA Cup winning players
Djorkaeff family
FIFA officials
French expatriate sportspeople in Monaco